Anneke Venema (born 19 January 1971) is a retired rower from the Netherlands. She won a silver medal in the women's eight with coxswain in the 2000 Summer Olympics in Sydney, Australia. At the 1996 Summer Olympics in Atlanta, United States, Venema and Elien Meijer finished 8th in the women's coxless pair.

References
  Dutch Olympic Committee

1971 births
Living people
Dutch female rowers
Rowers at the 1996 Summer Olympics
Rowers at the 2000 Summer Olympics
Olympic rowers of the Netherlands
Olympic silver medalists for the Netherlands
People from Veendam
Olympic medalists in rowing
Medalists at the 2000 Summer Olympics
21st-century Dutch women
20th-century Dutch women
Sportspeople from Groningen (province)